Miklós Jós (17 January 1906 – 30 April 1990) was a Hungarian writer. His work was part of the literature event in the art competition at the 1948 Summer Olympics.

References

1906 births
1990 deaths
20th-century Hungarian male writers
Olympic competitors in art competitions
People from Lučenec District